The women's high jump at the 2016 IAAF World Indoor Championships took place on March 20, 2016.

Four athletes were perfect through 1.93, Sofie Skoog, Lavern Spencer, masters world record holder Ruth Beitia and still in high school, Vashti Cunningham, the new indoor world junior record holder.  Airinė Palšytė and Kamila Lićwinko also managed the height but with several misses in the competition.  At 1.96, Cunningham cleared it with room to spare on her first attempt, keeping the perfect round going, which turned out to be the gold medal performance.  Beitia and Lićwinko cleared it on their second attempt with Beitia's perfect round beforehand being the difference for her silver medal.  Palšytė also cleared 1.96 on her last attempt, but it was too little, too late.  All athletes tried 1.99.  The three medalists had been over 1.99 in the past but nobody made it on this day.

Cunningham becomes the youngest female Indoor World Champion, just one day older than the youngest male, Mohammed Aman from the 2012 Championships.

Results
The final was started 13:00.

References

High jump
High jump at the World Athletics Indoor Championships
2016 in women's athletics